James Webster (born 11 July 1979) is an Australian professional rugby league football coach who was the head coach of the Featherstone Rovers in the Betfred Championship, and a former professional player.

He was previously of the Wakefield Trinity Wildcats and Hull Kingston Rovers. He then played in the Super League for  Hull Kingston Rovers, Hull F.C. and the Widnes Vikings. Webster stayed in England after retiring from playing and became a coach.

Background
Webster was born in Sydney, New South Wales, Australia. 

He is the older brother of former rugby league footballer and current New Zealand Warriors head coach,  Andrew Webster

Playing career

Balmain Tigers
Webster played rugby league in his home town of Sydney for Balmain.  Webster played in Balmain's final ever match as a first grade side, a 42–14 loss against Canberra.  Balmain then went on to merge with fellow foundation club Western Suburbs as part of the NRL rationalisation policy.

Parramatta Eels
Webster then moved to the Parramatta Eels, making 22 appearances in his time with Parramatta.

Hull Kingston Rovers
Webster was released from Hull Kingston Rovers on 2 May 2008.

Hull FC
Webster eventually joined rivals Hull. After only one game in a black and white jersey - Webster was released from his contract.

Widnes Vikings
It was then announced he had signed a two-year contract with Widnes. He joined National League One side Widnes for the 2009 season.

Coaching career

Hull FC
Webster turned his back on his playing career to focus on his coaching role with former club Hull, when he returned to the black and whites as Assistant Coach in 2010. He worked closely alongside Head Coach Richard Agar and fellow Assistant Coach Andy Last in his first major coaching opportunity, whilst he is also involved in the development of other young coaches with the Rugby Football League. In early 2014, Webster was playing for amateur rugby club Hornsea RUFC, he earned one cap and also offered coaching support.

Wakefield Trinity Wildcats
On 2 June 2014, Webster replaced the Wakefield Trinity Wildcats head coach Richard Agar as the new head coach of the Super League club. On 19 May 2015, Webster left Wakefield Trinity Wildcats.

Hull Kingston Rovers
In March 2016, Webster was named Interim Coach of Hull Kingston Rovers replacing the sacked Chris Chester. Webster became the assistant coach at Hull Kingston Rovers when he was replaced by Tim Sheens as head coach from the 2017 season.

Featherstone Rovers
In October 2019, was named head coach of Featherstone Rovers replacing Ryan Carr who return home to Australia.  Webster guided Featherstone to the 2021 Million Pound Game where they lost against Toulouse Olympique.  On 22 October 2021, he stood down from the role as head coach at Featherstone by mutual consent.

References

External links
Hull KR profile
 (archived by web.archive.org) Hull Kingston Rovers ~ Captains

1979 births
Living people
Australian rugby league coaches
Australian rugby league players
Australian expatriate sportspeople in England
Balmain Tigers players
Featherstone Rovers coaches
Hull F.C. players
Hull Kingston Rovers coaches
Hull Kingston Rovers players
Parramatta Eels players
Rugby league halfbacks
Rugby league players from Sydney
Wakefield Trinity coaches
Widnes Vikings players